Andrew Matthew Timme (born September 9, 2000) is an American college basketball player for the Gonzaga Bulldogs of the West Coast Conference (WCC). He is a three-time consensus All-American selection, including first-team honors as a senior in 2023. He has twice been voted the WCC Player of the Year.

Early life and high school career
Timme grew up in the northern Dallas suburb of Richardson, Texas, and attended J. J. Pearce High School. As a junior, he averaged 27.7 points, 17.9 rebounds and 4.3 assists and was named the District 8-6A Most Valuable Player and second team All-State by USA Today. Timme was consensus top-50 prospect in the 2019 class among major recruiting services. He committed to playing college basketball for Gonzaga in November of his senior year after considering offers from Texas A&M, Texas, Michigan State, Illinois, Arizona and Alabama.

College career
Timme spent most of his true freshman season as a key reserve for the Bulldogs, occasionally starting. Timme was named to the WCC All-Freshman team. Timme scored a season high 20 points in a 90–60 win over Saint Mary's on February 8, 2020. He tied for the team lead with 17 points scored in the Bulldogs' 2020 WCC tournament championship game win over Saint Mary's. Timme averaged 9.8 points and 5.4 rebounds per game, shooting a team-high 61.8 percent from the field.

Coming into his sophomore season, Timme was named to the Preseason All-WCC team as well as the watchlist for the Karl Malone Award. On November 27, 2020, he had 28 points and 10 rebounds in a 90–67 win against Auburn. Timme averaged 19.0 points, 7.0 rebounds and 2.3 assists per game, helping lead Gonzaga to the title game. He earned first-team All-WCC honors as well as winning the Karl Malone Award and was a consensus second-team All-America selection.

On November 13, 2021, Timme scored a then-career-high 37 points and added seven rebounds and three assists in an 86–74 win against then fifth-ranked Texas. On the season, he averaged 18.4 points, 6.8 rebounds, and 2.8 assists over 32 games. At the close of the regular season, Timme was named WCC Player of the Year and repeated as a consensus second-team All-American. After the season he entered his name into the 2022 NBA Draft, but ultimately withdrew in order to return to Gonzaga for his senior season.

Timme entered his senior season as a unanimous preseason All-American selection. He set a new career high with 38 points in a 99-90 win over Pacific on January 21, 2023. Timme scored his 2,000th career point during a 15-point performance on February 3, 2023, in a 88–70 win over Santa Clara. Timme was named the co-WCC Player of the Year, sharing the award with Brandin Podziemski of Santa Clara. He was the first player to repeat as WCC Player of the Year since Blake Stepp won it in 2003 and 2004. Timme was also named a consensus first-team All-American. On March 7, Timme passed Frank Burgess's career scoring record of 2,196 points, which had been set in 1961, during an 18-point the Bulldogs' 77–51 win over Saint Mary's in the West Coast Conference tournament championship game. He was also named the tournament's Most Outstanding Player.

At the end of the 2022–23 regular season, he told media on more than one occasion that he planned to leave Gonzaga for the professional ranks after the NCAA tournament, choosing not to take advantage of the NCAA eligibility waiver granted to all basketball players active in the COVID-affected 2020–21 season.

Career statistics

College

|-
| style="text-align:left;"| 2019–20
| style="text-align:left;"| Gonzaga
| 33 || 4 || 20.5 || .618 || .333 || .611 || 5.4 || 1.3 || .5 || .9 || 9.8
|-
| style="text-align:left;"| 2020–21
| style="text-align:left;"| Gonzaga
| 32 || 32 || 28.2 || .655 || .286 || .696 || 7.0 || 2.3 || .7 || .7 || 19.0
|-
| style="text-align:left;"| 2021–22
| style="text-align:left;"| Gonzaga
| 32 || 32 || 28.0 || .586 || .286 || .678 || 6.8 || 2.8 || .3 || .8 || 18.4
|- class="sortbottom"
| style="text-align:center;" colspan="2"| Career
| 97 || 68 || 25.5 || .619 || .288 || .670 || 6.4 || 2.1 || .5 || .8 || 15.7

Personal life
Timme's father, Matt Timme, played college basketball at Southern Methodist University, followed by a brief stint playing professionally in Europe. Drew's mother Megan, whom Matt married not long after he returned from Europe, played tennis at Stephen F. Austin State University.

References

External links
Gonzaga Bulldogs bio

2000 births
Living people
All-American college men's basketball players
American men's basketball players
Basketball players from Texas
Gonzaga Bulldogs men's basketball players
People from Richardson, Texas
Power forwards (basketball)
Sportspeople from the Dallas–Fort Worth metroplex